Robert Comyn may refer to:

 Robert Comyn (died 1306), Scottish nobleman
 Robert Comyn (priest) (1672–1727), English priest
 Robert Buckley Comyn (1792–1853), British judge

See also
 Robert de Comines (died 1069), Earl of Northumbria